Liu Xuanxuan (born 18 June 2000) is a Chinese badminton player from Hunan. She was part of the national junior team that won the mixed team title at the 2017 and 2018 World Junior Championships and also at the 2018 Asian Junior Championships. In the individual junior event, she was the girls' doubles champion at the 2018 World Junior Championships partnered with Xia Yuting.Liu won her first senior international title at the 2018 Lingshui China Masters in the mixed doubles event partnered with Guo Xinwa.

Achievements

World Junior Championships 
Girls' doubles

Mixed doubles

Asian Junior Championships 
Girls' doubles

Mixed doubles

BWF World Tour (2 titles, 2 runners-up) 
The BWF World Tour, which was announced on 19 March 2017 and implemented in 2018, is a series of elite badminton tournaments sanctioned by the Badminton World Federation (BWF). The BWF World Tour is divided into levels of World Tour Finals, Super 1000, Super 750, Super 500, Super 300 (part of the HSBC World Tour), and the BWF Tour Super 100.

Women's doubles

Mixed doubles

BWF International Challenge/Series (1 title) 
Women's doubles

  BWF International Challenge tournament
  BWF International Series tournament

References

External links 
 

2000 births
Living people
Badminton players from Hunan
Chinese female badminton players
21st-century Chinese women